Ruth is an unincorporated community and locality in St. Martin Parish, Louisiana, United States.

References

Lafayette metropolitan area, Louisiana
Unincorporated communities in Louisiana
Unincorporated communities in St. Martin Parish, Louisiana